Stephen Shennan, FBA is a British archaeologist and academic. Since 1996, he has been Professor of Theoretical Archaeology. He was Director of the Institute of Archaeology at the University College London from 2005 to 2014.

Shennan focuses on cultural evolution and Darwinian archaeology, applying theories from evolutionary ecology and cladistics to archaeology. In July 2006, Shennan was elected Fellow of the British Academy. Shennan was also awarded the RAI Huxley Medal 2021.

References

Selected works

External links
Shennans profile at UCL

British archaeologists
Living people
Fellows of the British Academy
Academics of the UCL Institute of Archaeology
Year of birth missing (living people)